Daniel Thomas Gronkowski (born January 21, 1985) is an American former football tight end. He was drafted by the Detroit Lions in the seventh round of the 2009 NFL Draft, after playing college football at Maryland. He also played for the Denver Broncos (2010), New England Patriots (2011) and Cleveland Browns (2011–2012).

Early years
Gronkowski was born in Amherst, New York to parents Gordon, and Diane Walters. His four brothers – Gordie, Chris, Rob, and Glenn – all played collegiate sports, and later played professionally. His great-grandfather, Ignatius, was a member of the 1924 U.S. Olympic cycling team in Paris.

Gronkowski attended Williamsville North High School where he played football, baseball, basketball, and ice hockey. He was a two-year starting quarterback and a one-year starting wide receiver. As a sophomore in 2001, he set a then-school record with 539 receiving yards. During his senior year in 2003, he completed 122 of 207 passes for 1,407 yards and 16 touchdowns, all of which were school records. He was named the league offensive Most Valuable Player. He was recruited by Maryland, Arizona, Purdue, and Syracuse.

Gronkowski has a bachelor's in Marketing, and has a master's in Business Administration.

Football career

College
Gronkowski attended the University of Maryland and sat out the 2004 season as a redshirt. In 2005, he saw action in five games and made two receptions for 37 yards, including a career-long 25-yard touchdown reception from Sam Hollenbach. In 2006, he saw action in all 13 games including nine starts. He had two receptions for 11 yards. He received the George Boutselis Memorial Award for team's highest GPA. In 2007, Gronkowski played in 11 games including eight starts and caught seven passes for 66 yards. He received the team's C.P. "Lefty" McIntosh Award for public service.

In 2008, he played in all 13 games and started in 12. He caught 29 passes for 287 yards and three touchdowns, including one matching his career-long 25-yard reception in 2005. He also some action on special teams and returned two kicks for eight and four yards. He was named an honorable mention All-ACC player.

He earned a degree in marketing and was pursuing an MBA when he was drafted. He was also in the process to be nominated as a Rhodes Scholar his final year at the University of Maryland.

Professional

Pre-draft

Draft Countdown assessed him as the 21st-ranked tight end prospect for the 2009 NFL Draft. The NFL Draft Scout ranked him the 11th out of 96 tight end prospects and projected him as a fifth or sixth round selection.

Detroit Lions
Gronkowski was drafted 255th overall (2nd to last) by the Detroit Lions in the 2009 NFL Draft. On June 25, 2009, he signed a three-year $1.21 million deal, which included a signing bonus of around $26,000. He was waived on September 5, 2009, and signed to the Lions' practice squad a day later.

Gronkowski was promoted to the active roster on December 1, 2009, after tight end Brandon Pettigrew was placed on injured reserve due to a knee injury. He caught his first pass against the Baltimore Ravens on December 13. He was waived on December 17, and re-signed to Lions' practice squad on December 20.

After his practice squad contract expired, Gronkowski was signed to a future reserve contract on January 5, 2010.

Denver Broncos
He was traded to the Denver Broncos on September 4, 2010, for cornerback Alphonso Smith. He was released on September 3, 2011.

New England Patriots
Gronkowski signed with the New England Patriots on September 6, 2011. However, after playing in two games, he was waived on September 23.  He re-signed with the team on October 10. On November 8, 2011, Gronkowski was released for a second time.

Cleveland Browns
After Browns tight end Alex Smith was placed on the Injured Reserve, the Browns signed Gronkowski to a one-year contract on December 20, 2011. On August 31, 2012, he was released by the team but  re-signed on January 3, 2013, to a futures deal. He was released by the team again on August 30, 2013.

Personal life
After his NFL career, Gronkowski joined the family-run businesses including G&G Fitness and Gronk Fitness equipments where he is in charge of marketing and product development.  He married Brittany M. Blujus on July 9, 2011, in Amherst, New York. They have three children.

In early 2021 Gronkowski, along with his family, opened a NexGen Fitness franchise studio in Buffalo, NY.  NexGen Fitness is a high-end, boutique personal training franchise currently operating personal training studios in Texas, Oklahoma and New York with other locations schedule to open throughout the country.

References

External links
 New England Patriots profile
 Maryland profile

1985 births
Living people
21st-century American businesspeople
American football tight ends
Cleveland Browns players
Detroit Lions players
Denver Broncos players
Maryland Terrapins football players
New England Patriots players
People from Amherst, New York
People from Williamsville, New York
Players of American football from New York (state)
American people of Polish descent
Gronkowski family
Sportspeople from Buffalo, New York